The ReVe Festival: Day 2 (occasionally referred as Day 2) is the fourth special extended play and the  by South Korean girl group Red Velvet, released on August 20, 2019, through SM Entertainment. The EP was announced on August 12, and it became available to pre-order the same day. This EP is the second release of The ReVe Festival trilogy, with six tracks feature in the EP including the EP's single "Umpah Umpah", which also serves as the second single from The ReVe Festival trilogy.

Promotion
The EP was announced through social media on August 11, 2019, with a teaser image of pink and sandy desert with the logo The ReVe Festival: Day 2.

Commercial performance
The ReVe Festival: Day 2 was a commercial success, debuted atop of Gaon Weekly Album Chart, become the group's tenth number one album on the chart, extended Red Velvet's record as the girl group with most number one albums on the chart. The CD version of the EP debuted on the monthly chart of Gaon Album Chart with 107,554 copies being sold, became the fourth best-selling album of the month August 2019, and also placing at the fifty-first for the year, with 111,654 copies sold. The EP also peaked at number six on the Billboard World Albums Chart.

Track listing

Charts

Weekly charts

Year-end charts

Release history

See also
 The ReVe Festival: Day 1
 The ReVe Festival: Finale
 The ReVe Festival 2022 - Feel My Rhythm

References

2019 EPs
Red Velvet (group) EPs
IRiver EPs